Interleukin-36 alpha also known as interleukin-1 family member 6 (IL1F6) is a protein that in humans is encoded by the IL36A gene.

References

Further reading